Karsznice Małe  is a village in the administrative district of Gmina Chąśno, within Łowicz County, Łódź Voivodeship, in central Poland.

References

Villages in Łowicz County